Hell III is the third studio album by multi-instrumentalist M.S.W.'s Salem-based doom metal solo project Hell. Originally released on October 11, 2012, the album was available on cassette through Eternal Warfare, on vinyl through Pesanta, and digitally through M.S.W.'s own label, LowerYourHead.

Hell III was performed in its entirety on the project's 2016 tour.

Background and composition
Hell, a one-man project, concluded a trilogy of albums with Hell III. While the series began as pure doom metal, Hell II and, to a greater degree, Hell III incorporate black metal and funeral doom aspects into the music. Included with the moments of weight, aggression, extremely distorted guitar, and rasped vocals are periods of somber melancholy. The album comprises two songs, "Mourn" and "Decedere", both of which near twenty minutes in length.

"Mourn"
Hell III's first half, "Mourn", begins with a slow, clean guitar segment that lasts for five minutes. Ben Hudgins of Heathen Harvest wrote about this passage, "there’s a lengthy ambient guitar introduction that sulks on the borders of the apocalyptic domain of black metal before plunging over the edge into the tar-choked realms of sludge." Following that, the song quickly transitions into the downtuned guitar and driving percussion signature to doom metal. Unlike many singers in similar bands, M.S.W.'s vocals are delivered as high-pitched rasps. At the halfway point of "Mourn", the song slows and descends into a heavy passage that gradually decays and fades.

"Decedere"

The album's second half, "Decedere", took four years to complete. It follows a similar structure as "Mourn", beginning with "solemn and ambient guitar melodies" and later launching into protracted periods of heightened aggression before returning to quiet softness at the conclusion. Operatic vocals provided by Leah Estep appear alongside M.S.W.'s screams and rasps.

About performing "Decedere" live, M.S.W. said:

Critical reception
Hell III was met with positive reception. In a review of Trilogy, a box set concluding with Hell III, Cody Davis of Metal Injection wrote, "It is a demented and diabolical listening experience worth turning out all of the lights and succumbing to the trepidation for an hour or so." Benjamin Bland of Echoes and Dust called Hell III "quite the journey," saying in his review, "The emotional power of this album is fairly devastating if you’re in a bleak frame of mind and the willingness of M.S.W. to draw in influences from inside and outside the drone and metal spheres to enhance his atmospheric vision is perhaps what makes this a rare essential listen." Writing for Heathen Harvest, Ben Hudgins said that Hell III cements the trilogy as unpredictable and full of surprises.

Track listing
All songs written by M.S.W..

Personnel
Credits adapted from liner notes.

Hell
 M.S.W. – guitar, bass, drums, vocals, programming

Additional musicians
 Holly Williams – flute
 Marit Schmidt – viola
 Leah Estep – operatic vocals

Technical personnel
 Absorb – logo
 Dan Randall – mastering

References

2012 albums
Hell (American band) albums